SS Maine was a British steamship launched in 1905 as a 3600-ton cargo steamer with a triple-expansion engine.

The Torbay British Sub-Aqua Club bought the wreck for £100 in 1962 and salvaged the bronze propeller, selling it for £800.

The propeller was proudly displayed on a plinth outside Safeway supermarket in Paignton town centre, until the redevelopment of the site in the early 2000s. The propeller was being sold for scrap, but was rescued by a farmer and now is in a field in Kingsteignton.

References

1904 ships
Wreck diving sites in the United Kingdom
World War I shipwrecks in the English Channel
Ships sunk by German submarines in World War I
Maritime incidents in 1917